The Pârâul lui Martin is a left tributary of the river Jijia in Romania. It flows into Jijia in Hilișeu-Cloșca.

References

Rivers of Romania
Rivers of Botoșani County